Andrija Novosel (born 12 August 1993) is a Slovenian footballer who plays for Ivančna Gorica.

References

1993 births
Living people
Footballers from Zagreb
Slovenian footballers
Association football midfielders
Slovenian PrvaLiga players
NK Ivančna Gorica players
NK Krka players